The 1994 United States House of Representatives elections in Texas occurred on November 8, 1994, to elect the members of the state of Texas's delegation to the United States House of Representatives. Texas had thirty seats in the House, apportioned according to the 1990 United States Census.

In early 1994, several Republicans sued the state alleging that District 18 and District 29 were racially gerrymandered. District 30 was later added to the case, and in August, a federal judicial panel ordered the state to redraw its congressional districts. A separate panel later allowed the struck districts to be used for the 1994 elections, but it ordered the state to redraw its districts before the 1996 elections. This decision was later appealed and became the Supreme Court case Bush v. Vera.

These elections occurred simultaneously with the United States Senate elections of 1994, the United States House elections in other states, and various state and local elections.

Amidst the Republican Revolution, in which the Republican Party took control of the U.S. House for the first time since 1952, Republicans gained two seats in the U.S. House of Representatives from Texas and won the statewide popular vote, but Democrats maintained their majority of Texas seats due to redistricting.

Overview

Congressional Districts

District 1 
Incumbent Democrat Jim Chapman ran for re-election.

District 2 
Incumbent Democrat Charlie Wilson ran for re-election.

District 3 
Incumbent Republican Sam Johnson ran for re-election.

District 4 
Incumbent Democrat Ralph Hall ran for re-election.

District 5 
Incumbent Democrat John Wiley Bryant ran for re-election.

District 6 
Incumbent Republican Joe Barton ran for re-election.

District 7 
Incumbent Republican Bill Archer ran for re-election unopposed.

District 8 
Incumbent Republican Jack Fields ran for re-election.

District 9 
Incumbent Democrat Jack Brooks ran for re-election.

District 10 
Incumbent Democrat J. J. Pickle opted to retire rather than run for re-election.

District 11 
Incumbent Democrat Chet Edwards ran for re-election.

District 12 
Incumbent Democrat Pete Geren ran for re-election.

District 13 
Incumbent Democrat Bill Sarpalius ran for re-election.

District 14 
Incumbent Democrat Greg Laughlin ran for re-election.

District 15 
Incumbent Democrat Kika de la Garza ran for re-election.

District 16 
Incumbent Democrat Ronald D. Coleman ran for re-election.

District 17 
Incumbent Democrat Charles Stenholm ran for re-election.

District 18 
Incumbent Democrat Craig Washington ran for re-election. He was defeated in the Democratic Primary by Houston City Councilor Sheila Jackson Lee.

District 19 
Incumbent Republican Larry Combest ran for re-election unopposed.

District 20 
Incumbent Democrat Henry B. González ran for re-election.

District 21 
Incumbent Republican Lamar Smith ran for re-election.

District 22 
Incumbent Republican Tom DeLay ran for re-election.

District 23 
Incumbent Republican Henry Bonilla ran for re-election.

District 24 
Incumbent Democrat Martin Frost ran for re-election.

District 25 
Incumbent Democrat Michael A. Andrews retired to run for U.S. Senator.

District 26 
Incumbent Republican Dick Armey ran for re-election. He became the first Texas Republican to be elected majority leader of the U.S. House of Representatives.

District 27 
Incumbent Democrat Solomon Ortiz ran for re-election.

District 28 
Incumbent Democrat Frank Tejeda ran for re-election.

District 29 
Incumbent Democrat Gene Green ran for re-election.

District 30 
Incumbent Democrat Eddie Bernice Johnson ran for re-election.

References 

Texas
1994
1994 Texas elections